The Baeksang Arts Award for Best Supporting Actor – Television is an award presented annually at the Baeksang Arts Awards ceremony organised by Ilgan Sports and JTBC Plus, affiliates of JoongAng Ilbo, usually in the second quarter of each year in Seoul.

Winners and nominees

2010s

2020s

References

Sources

External links
  

Baeksang Arts Awards (television)
Television awards for Best Supporting Actor
Television acting awards